Ron Husmann (born June 30, 1937) is a retired American actor who primarily acted in musicals. In 1961, he was nominated for a Tony Award and won a Theatre World Award for his performance in the original production of Tenderloin.

Biography
Born in Rockford, Illinois, Husmann graduated from Northwestern University in 1959. He made his Broadway debut in Fiorello! in November 1959. In October 1960 he appeared on Broadway in Tenderloin, garnering a Tony Award nomination for Best Featured Actor in a Musical and winning the Theatre World Award for his performance.

Additional Broadway credits include All-American (1962), Lovely Ladies, Kind Gentlemen (1970), On the Town (revival, 1971), Irene (1973), and Can-Can (1981).

Husmann made his film debut in the 1965 melodrama Love Has Many Faces. Most of his screen credits have been on television. One of his first was a co-starring role in the unaired 1965 ABC television pilot Two's Company starring Marlo Thomas. He has appeared in the daytime soaps General Hospital and Days of Our Lives, as well as such primetime series as Dr. Kildare, Land of the Giants, Get Smart, The F.B.I., Archie Bunker's Place, and Cheers.

He appeared in the 1972 telecast of Once Upon a Mattress with Carol Burnett.

Husmann is the author, narrator, and co-producer of the ten-hour video series Broadway! A History of the Musical.

He retired from performing after being stricken with multiple sclerosis.

References

External links
 
 

American male stage actors
American male musical theatre actors
American male television actors
Northwestern University School of Communication alumni
Actors from Rockford, Illinois
1937 births
Living people
People with multiple sclerosis